Cold Spring Harbor High School is a public school for grades 7–12 in Cold Spring Harbor, New York, United States. In 2007, it was placed 52nd on Newsweeks Top 1300 High Schools list.

Cold Spring Harbor High School is ranked 33rd among public schools in New York and is the only high school in the Cold Spring Harbor Central School District. There are 989 students attending grades 7–12, and there are 85 teachers working full-time at the school with 65 percent having a master's degree or higher. The student body is 49 percent male and 51 percent female. The minority enrollment is 4 percent, with 2 percent Asian, 1 percent black, and 1 percent Hispanic. White enrollment is 96 percent. AP participation rate among students is 82 percent, and about 68 percent of the students were found to be proficient in math and or reading. The graduation rate at Cold Spring Harbor High School is 95 percent. Average SAT scores are around 1300 and the average ACT score is 29.

Notable alumni

 James Dolan, Cablevision CEO
 Amanda Forsythe, award-winning light lyric soprano
 Alex Foxen, professional poker player
 Jay Jalbert, professional lacrosse player
 Meredith O'Connor, recording artist, entertainer 
 Lindsay Lohan, actress, singer, model (did not graduate)
 Kathleen Sullivan, professor and former dean, Stanford Law School
 Wally Szczerbiak, former NBA player
 PT Walkley, musician
 Meg Whitman, President and CEO of Hewlett-Packard; former president and CEO of eBay; former candidate for the governorship of California
 Adrienne La Russa, actress

References

External links
Cold Spring Harbor Jr./Sr. High School's website
Seahawks Athletics/Booster Club website

Public high schools in New York (state)
Huntington, New York
Schools in Suffolk County, New York
Public middle schools in New York (state)

1962 establishments in New York (state)